Southbourne railway station serves the village of Southbourne, West Sussex, England. It is on the West Coastway Line between Brighton and Southampton,  from Brighton.

It was originally opened in 1906, when it was called Southbourne Halt.

Facilities
The station has a ticket office which is staffed throughout the week on weekday and Saturday mornings and early afternoons (06:40-13:10). At other times, the station is unstaffed and tickets can be purchased from the self-service ticket machine during these times. Both platforms have seated areas and modern help points available.

Step-free access is available to both the platforms at Southbourne.

Services
All services at Southbourne are operated by Southern using  and s.

The typical off-peak service in trains per hour is:
 1 tph to  via 
 1 tph to  via 
 1 tph to 
 1 tph to 

Until May 2022, one Great Western Railway service from Portsmouth Harbour to Brighton called at Southbourne.

References

External links

Former London, Brighton and South Coast Railway stations
Railway stations in Great Britain opened in 1906
Railway stations in West Sussex
DfT Category E stations
Railway stations served by Govia Thameslink Railway
Southbourne, West Sussex